Charles Dymoke Green Jr.  (10 February 1907 – 23 October 1988) was The Boy Scouts Association's Commonwealth commissioner until 1970 and the World Organization of the Scout Movement's World Scout Committee chairman.

His father, Charles Dymoke Green Senior was a close friend of Robert Baden-Powell and involved in The Boy Scouts Association in the United Kingdom. In 1941, he was The Boy Scouts Association Rover commissioner in Colombo, Ceylon and organized a unit of mounted Scouts. He supported Kingsley C. Dassanaike work to promote Scouting for the deaf and blind. In 1971, he was awarded the 63rd Bronze Wolf, the only distinction of the World Organization of the Scout Movement, by its World Scout Committee, for exceptional services to world Scouting, the highest distinction of the Scout Association of Japan, the Golden Pheasant Award,  and the first Silver World Award.

References

External links

1907 births
1988 deaths
People from St Albans
The Scout Association
World Scout Committee members
Recipients of the Bronze Wolf Award
Charles
20th-century British businesspeople
British people in British Ceylon